The crab-eating rat (Ichthyomys hydrobates) is a species of semiaquatic rodent in the family Cricetidae.
It is found in Colombia, Ecuador, and Venezuela.
Its natural habitats are rivers and swamps.

References

Ichthyomys
Mammals of Colombia
Mammals of Ecuador
Mammals of Venezuela
Mammals described in 1891
Taxa named by Herluf Winge
Taxonomy articles created by Polbot